The True Meaning is the second solo studio album by American rapper Cormega. It was released on June 25, 2002 via Legal Hustle/Landspeed Records. Production was handled by J "Waxx" Garfield, J-Love, Alchemist, Buckwild, DR Period, Emile, Hangmen 3, Hi-Tek, Hot Day, and Large Professor, who also provided the lone guest appearance on the album.

The album peaked at number 95 on the Billboard 200, number 25 on the Top R&B/Hip-Hop Albums and number five on the Independent Albums in the United States. Its lead single, "Built For This", reached number 58 on the Hot R&B/Hip-Hop Singles Sales.

It was critically acclaimed and won the prestigious "Independent Album of the Year" at The Source Awards 2003. He also received "Impact Artist of the Year" honors at the Underground Music Awards. It was praised for its "back to basics" formula, tight beats and fierce rhymes. Standout tracks include "Live Ya Life", "Love In Love Out" which documents Cormega's feud with fellow Queensbridge rapper Nas, and "Verbal Graffiti".

Track listing

Personnel
Cory "Cormega" McKay – vocals, art direction, sleeve notes
Nicky Guiland – vocals (track 3)
Paul "Large Professor" Mitchell – vocals & producer (track 9)
Emile Haynie – producer (track 1)
Jeffrey Backues Neal – producer (track 2)
John Bynoe – producer (track 2)
Raymond "Benzino" Scott – producer (track 2)
Jay "Waxx" Garfield – producer (tracks: 3, 10, 11)
Darryl "DR Period" Pittman – producer (track 4)
Anthony "Buckwild" Best – producer (track 5)
Alan "The Alchemist" Maman – producer (track 6)
Jason "J-Love" Elias – producer (tracks: 8, 13)
Tony "Hi-Tek" Cottrell – producer (track 12)
"Hot Day" Dante Franklin – producer (track 14)
Max Vargas – recording, mixing
Trevor "Karma" Gendron – design, layout
Jonathan Mannion – photography
Matthew Doszkocs – photography
Theo Sedlmayr – legal

Charts

References

External links

2002 albums
Cormega albums
Albums produced by Hi-Tek
Albums produced by Buckwild
Albums produced by Emile Haynie
Albums produced by Large Professor
Albums produced by the Alchemist (musician)